Víctor Manuel Estupiñán Mairongo (born 5 March 1988) is an Ecuadorian professional footballer who plays as a forward for Galácticos FC.

Club career
Estupiñán was born in Quinindé. He began his career in the youth ranks of LDU Quito. In 2006, he made his debut for the senior side and has been a member of the side that has captured numerous domestic and continental titles since 2007. He participated in the 2009 Copa Sudamericana title run appearing in three matches and assisting on two goals. On 5 November 2009, he helped lead LDU Quito over Vélez Sársfield providing one assist in a 2–1 victory which helped his side reach the semifinals. Following the 2009 season it was reported that Estupiñán would be sent on loan to Macará in order to receive increased playing time, but the move never materialized.

In 2011, he was drafted 14th in the first round of the MLS SuperDraft by Chivas USA. After one season in Los Angeles, Chivas USA opted to decline the option on Estupiñán's contract.

International career
Estupiñán was a member of the Ecuador U20 national team.

Honors
LDU Quito
Serie A: 2007, 2010
Copa Sudamericana: 2009

References

External links
Estupiñán's FEF Player Card

1988 births
Living people
People from Quinindé Canton
Association football forwards
Ecuadorian expatriate sportspeople in the United States
Ecuadorian footballers
L.D.U. Quito footballers
Chivas USA players
C.D. Universidad Católica del Ecuador footballers
C.D. Técnico Universitario footballers
C.D. Cuenca footballers
S.D. Quito footballers
C.D. Quevedo footballers
S.D. Aucas footballers
Mushuc Runa S.C. footballers
L.D.U. Portoviejo footballers
C.D. Clan Juvenil footballers
Ecuadorian expatriate footballers
Expatriate soccer players in the United States
Major League Soccer players
Chivas USA draft picks